is an English trusts law case concerning the common law remedies for receipt of trust property.

Facts
Mr Zdiri, an Agip Ltd employee, changed the name on a payment order of $518,000 to Baker Oil Services Ltd, a puppet controlled by Mr Jackson and other accountants, who acted on clients’ instructions. The money was transferred from Banque du Sud in Tunisia to Baker Oil’s account with Lloyds Bank in London. All but $43,000 was then paid on to unknown parties. Agip Ltd sued Mr Jackson for return of the money.

Judgment

High Court
Judge Peter Millett held that Agip Ltd was entitled to an equitable proprietary claim for the $43,000 from Jackson, and that the accountants were liable for 'knowing assistance in a breach of trust'. However, Agip Ltd could not succeed for receipt of the money at common law (which did not allow electronic rather than physical tracing) or in equity (because the money was not transferred for the accountants' benefit). Banks can be liable in knowing receipt only if they receive and apply trust money to reduce or discharge a customer's overdraft. Otherwise, banks merely pay and receive money as agents of their customers. It must be for their own 'use and benefit'. He suggested that the liability for knowing receipt could be imposed if the circumstances would put an honest and reasonable person on inquiry. Agip Ltd appealed on the common law point.

Court of Appeal
The Court of Appeal upheld Judge Millett's decision. Michael Fox gave judgement, while Elizabeth Butler-Sloss  and Roy Beldam concurred.

Notes

References

English trusts law

External links
 THE ACCOUNTANTS' LAUNDROMAT

English trusts case law
Court of Appeal (England and Wales) cases
1990 in British law
1990 in case law